The United States House Natural Resources Subcommittee on Insular and Indian Affairs is one of the five subcommittees within the House Natural Resources Committee. It was known until the 118th Congress as the Subcommittee on Indigenous Peoples of the United States.

Jurisdiction
Measures relating to the welfare of Native Americans, including management of Indian lands in general and special measures relating to claims which are paid out of Indian funds.
All matters regarding the relations of the United States with Native Americans and Native American tribes, including special oversight functions under House Rule X.
All matters regarding Native Alaskans.
All matters related to the Federal trust responsibility to Native Americans and the sovereignty of Native Americans.
General and continuing oversight and investigative authority over activities policies and programs within the jurisdiction of the Subcommittee.
All matters regarding insular areas of the United States.
All measures or matters regarding the Freely Associated States.
All matters regarding Native Hawaiians.

Members, 117th Congress

Historical membership rosters

116th Congress

115th Congress

References

External links 
 Subcommittee page

Natural Resources Indigenous
Native American topics